Artiom Zabun (born 23 April 1996) is a Moldovan footballer who plays as a forward for TSK Simferopol in Crimea.

Notes

References

External links

Profile at Crimean Football Union

1996 births
Living people
Moldovan footballers
Moldova youth international footballers
Moldova international footballers
Association football forwards
Moldovan expatriate footballers
Expatriate footballers in Belarus
Expatriate footballers in Azerbaijan
Expatriate footballers in Romania
Moldovan expatriate sportspeople in Belarus
Moldovan expatriate sportspeople in Azerbaijan
Moldovan expatriate sportspeople in Romania
Moldovan Super Liga players
Belarusian Premier League players
Azerbaijan Premier League players
Crimean Premier League players
Liga II players
FC Sheriff Tiraspol players
FC Saxan players
FC Victoria Bardar players
FC Krumkachy Minsk players
FC Sfîntul Gheorghe players
Sabah FC (Azerbaijan) players
FC Codru Lozova players
SSU Politehnica Timișoara players
CSM Focșani players
FC TSK Simferopol players